Gayton McKenzie is a businessman and the current Mayor of The Central Karoo District in South Africa businessman, motivational speaker, author, and president of the Patriotic Alliance political party. He came to prominence in the early 2000s for his role in a prison exposé that eventually led to his early release amid an investigation of prison corruption by the Jali Commission of Inquiry. McKenzie grew up in the Bloemfontein neighborhood of Heidedal, South Africa. He is also a prominent member of Operation Dudula.

Business activities 

McKenzie used his story of shifting from a life of crime during the apartheid years in South Africa to attaining success as a businessman as the basis for his popular motivational talks. He traveled to many schools in South Africa during his early years as a speaker, sponsored by a security company.

He has gone on to work as a consultant in the mining industry and runs a diversified business with interests in restaurants, hotels and events venues, logistics and transport, imports, mining, energy, entertainment and events, publishing and farming.

Publishing 

Many of his books have been bestsellers in South Africa, starting with The Choice: The Gayton McKenzie Story. Other books include A Hustler's Bible, The Uncomfortable Truth, Trapped, Kill Zuma By Any Means Necessary, and A Hustler's Bible, The New Testament.

Politics
McKenzie launched the Patriotic Alliance political party on 30 November 2013, and became the party's first president. McKenzie, along with long-time friend Kenny Kunene, have become known for using open letters to provoke political debate, cause controversy and attract attention. Kunene left the Economic Freedom Fighters months after its formation before helping to launch the Patriotic Alliance. Kunene was later rumoured to have also left the Patriotic Alliance after the 2014 national elections, but he has strongly denied this.

At the end of April 2014, just more than a week before the elections of 7 May, McKenzie wrote a highly critical open letter to Economic Freedom Fighters president Julius Malema, which gained widespread attention. In the letter and in subsequent interviews, McKenzie referred to Malema as the "biggest threat facing South Africa". This was based partly on the EFF's policies on land expropriation and nationalisation. The primary criticism, however, was focused on the character of Malema himself, whom he accused of not being a real revolutionary, a "false prophet" whose promises would take South Africa to civil war and someone who had "stolen" significant amounts of public money during his political ascent. Malema dismissed the letter as predictable rhetoric prior to an election.

References

Living people
Patriotic Alliance (South Africa) politicians
South African businesspeople
Year of birth missing (living people)
Place of birth missing (living people)